Thomas Amory Deblois Fessenden (January 23, 1826 – September 28, 1868) was an American politician. He was a U.S. Representative from Maine.


Biography
Born in Portland, Maine, he attended North Yarmouth Academy and Dartmouth College and graduated from Bowdoin College in 1845. He then studied law and was admitted to the bar in April 1848. He established a practice in Mechanic Falls, Maine, and moved to Auburn, Maine in 1850, where he continuing working as an attorney.

He was a delegate to the Republican National Convention in 1856 and 1868 and a member of the Maine House of Representatives in 1860 and 1868, as well as prosecuting attorney for Androscoggin County in 1861 and 1862.

He was elected as a Republican to the 37th Congress to fill the vacancy caused by the resignation of Charles W. Walton and served from December 1, 1862, to March 3, 1863, and was not a candidate for renomination in 1862.

He returned to Maine and resumed the practice of law. He died in Auburn, and is interred in Evergreen Cemetery, Portland, Maine.

Family
He was the son of abolitionist legislator Samuel Fessenden, and brother of Treasury Secretary William P. Fessenden and congressman Samuel C. Fessenden. He was an uncle of Union Army generals Francis Fessenden and James D. Fessenden.

Family tree

External links

1826 births
1868 deaths
Dartmouth College alumni
Republican Party members of the Maine House of Representatives
People of Maine in the American Civil War
Bowdoin College alumni
Politicians from Portland, Maine
People from Mechanic Falls, Maine
Fessenden family
Burials at Evergreen Cemetery (Portland, Maine)
Republican Party members of the United States House of Representatives from Maine
19th-century American politicians
Politicians from Auburn, Maine